When G-Men Step In is a 1938 American action film, directed by Charles C. Coleman and starring Don Terry, Julie Bishop (billed as Jacqueline Wells), and Robert Paige. It released by Columbia Pictures.

Cast
 Don Terry as Frederick 'Fred' Garth
 Julie Bishop as Marjory Drake
 Robert Paige as G-Man Bruce Garth
 Gene Morgan as G-Man Theodore Neale
 Paul Fix as Clip Phillips - Fred's Henchman
 Stanley Andrews as Preston
 Edward Earle as Morton
 Horace McMahon as Jennings

References

External links
When G-Men Step In at the Internet Movie Database

1938 films
American action films
1930s action films
Films directed by Charles C. Coleman
American black-and-white films
Columbia Pictures films
1930s American films